ARC Caldas was one of two s built for the Colombian Navy during the 1930s. Originally ordered for the Portuguese Navy, the two ships were purchased by Colombia while still under construction. She was discarded in 1960 and subsequently scrapped.

Design and description
 
The Antioquias were powered by two Parsons-Curtis geared steam turbines, each driving one propeller shaft using steam provided by three Yarrow boilers.

Armament was similar to contemporary Royal Navy destroyers, with a gun armament of four 4.7 in (120 mm) Vickers-Armstrong Mk G guns, and three 2-pounder Mk VIII anti-aircraft guns. Two quadruple banks of 21-inch (533 mm) torpedo tubes were carried, while two depth charge throwers and 12 depth charges constituted the ships' anti-submarine armament. Up to 20 mines could be carried. The ships' complement consisted of 147 officers and men.

Citations

Sources
 

 

 
Destroyers of the Colombian Navy
1933 ships
Ships built in Portugal
Antioquia-class destroyers